The 35th Annual Grammy Awards were held on February 24, 1993 and recognized accomplishments by musicians from the previous year. The nominations were announced on January 7, 1993. The evening's host was the American stand-up comedian Garry Shandling, who hosted the ceremony for the third time. The CBS network broadcast the show live from the Shrine Auditorium in Los Angeles, California.

This particular Grammy live broadcast was the commercially most successful of its kind in the 1990s. As Nielsen Media Research and Billboard magazine stated on January 10, 2004, "the highest-rated Grammy show of the 1990s was the 1993 telecast, which got a 19.9 rating/31 share and 30 million United States viewers" alone. British guitarist and singer Eric Clapton (for whom still mourned for the loss of his son two years ago) was the night's big winner, winning six awards out of nine nominations including Album, Song and Record of the Year. 

Michael Jackson, having been recently interviewed in Oprah Winfrey Show had received the Grammy Legend Award from his sister Janet Jackson. A small segment of the show was "How to Become a Legend" narrated by Janet.

At the 45th Primetime Emmy Awards in 1993, the production mixers Ed Greene, Rick Himot, Don Worsham, David Hewitt and Paul Sandweiss were nominated for Outstanding Individual Achievement in Sound Mixing for a Variety or Music Series or a Special, losing to Star Trek: The Next Generation.

Performers

Presenters
 Janet Jackson – Grammy Legend Award to Michael Jackson
 Tina Turner & Garry Shandling – Record of the Year
 Tony Bennett & Natalie Cole – Album of the Year
 Bonnie Raitt & Lyle Lovett – Song of the Year
 Lindsey Buckingham, Melissa Etheridge & Vince Gill – Producer of the Year
 BeBe Winans, Mark Wahlberg & Mary Chapin Carpenter – Best New Artist
 LL Cool J – Best Rap Performance by a Duo or Group
 B.B. King & Billy Idol – Best Hard Rock Performance
 Pam Tillis & Lorrie Morgan – Best Male Country Vocal Performance
 Jon Secada & Kenny G – Best R&B Performance by a Duo or Group with Vocals
 Boyz II Men & Patti LaBelle – Best Female Pop Vocal Performance
 Gloria Estefan & James Brown – Best Male Pop Vocal Performance
 Sergio Mendes & Herbie Hancock –

Award winners
Record of the Year
Russ Titelman (producer) & Eric Clapton for "Tears in Heaven"
Album of the Year
Russ Titelman (producer) & Eric Clapton for Unplugged
Song of the Year
Eric Clapton & Will Jennings (songwriters) for "Tears in Heaven"
Best New Artist
Arrested Development

Alternative
Best Alternative Music Album
Tom Waits for Bone Machine

Blues
Best Traditional Blues Album
Dr. John for Goin' Back to New Orleans
Best Contemporary Blues Album
Stevie Ray Vaughan & Double Trouble for The Sky Is Crying

Children's
Best Album for Children
Alan Menken & Howard Ashman (songwriters) for Beauty and the Beast - Original Motion Picture Soundtrack performed by various artists

Classical
Best Orchestral Recording
Leonard Bernstein (conductor) & the Berlin Philharmonic Orchestra for Mahler: Symphony No. 9
Best Classical Vocal Performance
Kathleen Battle & Margo Garrett for Kathleen Battle at Carnegie Hall (Handel, Mozart, Liszt, Strauss, etc.) 
Best Opera Recording
Christopher Raeburn, Stephen Trainor, Morten Winding  (producers), Georg Solti (conductor), Hildegard Behrens, José van Dam, Plácido Domingo, Sumi Jo, Reinhild Runkel, Julia Varady & the Vienna Philharmonic Orchestra for R. Strauss: Die Frau Ohne Schatten
Best Performance of a Choral Work
Herbert Blomstedt (conductor), Vance George (choir director), the San Francisco Symphony Orchestra, the San Francisco Symphony Boys Choir & the San Francisco Symphony Girls Choir for Orff: Carmina Burana
Best Classical Performance - Instrumental Solo With Orchestra
Lorin Maazel (conductor), Yo-Yo Ma & the Pittsburgh Symphony Orchestra for Prokofiev: Sinfonia Concertante - Tchaikovsky: Variations on a Rococo Theme
Best Classical Performance - Instrumental Solo Without Orchestra
Vladimir Horowitz for Horowitz - Discovered Treasures (Chopin, Liszt, Scarlatti, Scriabin, Clementi)
Best Chamber Music Performance
Emanuel Ax & Yo-Yo Ma for Brahms: Sonatas for Cello & Piano
Best Contemporary Composition
Samuel Barber (composer), Andrew Schnenck (conductor) & the Chicago Symphony Orchestra for Barber: The Lovers
Best Classical Album
Horst Dittberner (producer), Leonard Bernstein (conductor) & the Berlin Philharmonic Orchestra for Mahler: Symphony No. 9

Comedy
Best Comedy Album
Peter Schickele for P.D.Q. Bach: Music for an Awful Lot of Winds and Percussion

Composing and arranging
Best Instrumental Composition
Benny Carter (composer) for Harlem Renaissance Suite
Best Song Written Specifically for a Motion Picture or Television
Howard Ashman & Alan Menken (songwriters) for Beauty and the Beast performed by Peabo Bryson & Céline Dion 
Best Instrumental Composition Written for a Motion Picture or for Television
Alan Menken (composer) for Beauty and the Beast performed by various artists
Best Arrangement on an Instrumental
Rob McConnell (arranger) for Strike Up the Band performed by Rob McConnell & The Boss Brass
Best Instrumental Arrangement Accompanying Vocal(s)
Johnny Mandel (arranger) for Here's to Life performed by Shirley Horn

Country
Best Country Vocal Performance, Female
Mary Chapin Carpenter for I Feel Lucky
Best Country Vocal Performance, Male
Vince Gill for I Still Believe in You
Best Country Performance by a Duo or Group with Vocal
Emmylou Harris & the Nash Ramblers for Emmylou Harris & the Nash Ramblers at the Ryman
Best Country Vocal Collaboration
Marty Stuart & Travis Tritt for The Whiskey Ain't Workin'
Best Country Instrumental Performance
Chet Atkins & Jerry Reed for Sneakin' Around
Best Country Song
Vince Gill and John Barlow Jarvis (songwriters) for I Still Believe in You, performed by Vince Gill
Best Bluegrass Album
Alison Krauss & Union Station for Every Time You Say Goodbye

Folk
Best Traditional Folk Album
The Chieftains for An Irish Evening - Live at the Grand Opera House, Belfast
Best Contemporary Folk Album
The Chieftains for Another Country

Gospel
Best Pop Gospel Album
Steven Curtis Chapman for The Great Adventure
Best Rock/Contemporary Gospel Album
Petra for Unseen Power
Best Traditional Soul Gospel Album
Shirley Caesar for He's Working It Out For You
Best Contemporary Soul Gospel Album
Mervyn E. Warren (producer) for Handel's Messiah - A Soulful Celebration performed by various artists
Best Southern Gospel Album
Bruce Carroll for Sometimes Miracles Hide
Best Gospel Album by a Choir or Chorus
Edwin Hawkins (choir director) for Edwin Hawkins Music & Arts Seminar Mass Choir - Recorded Live in Los Angeles performed by the Music & Arts Seminar Mass Choir

Historical
Best Historical Album
Michael Cuscuna (producer) for The Complete Capitol Recordings of The Nat "King" Cole Trio

Jazz
Best Jazz Instrumental Solo
Joe Henderson for "Lush Life" in Lush Life: The Music of Billy StrayhornBest Jazz Instrumental Performance, Individual or Group
Branford Marsalis for I Heard You Twice the First TimeBest Large Jazz Ensemble Performance
McCoy Tyner for The Turning PointBest Jazz Vocal Performance
Bobby McFerrin for "Round Midnight" in PlayBest Contemporary Jazz Performance (Instrumental)
Pat Metheny for Secret StoryLatin
Best Latin Pop Album
Jon Secada for Otro Día Más Sin VerteBest Tropical Latin Album
Linda Ronstadt for FrenesiBest Mexican-American Album
Linda Ronstadt for Mas CancionesMusical show
Best Musical Show Album
Jay David Saks (producer) & the New Broadway cast for Guys and Dolls - The New Broadway Cast RecordingMusic video
Best Music Video, Short Form
John Downer (video director & producer) & Peter Gabriel for Digging in the DirtBest Music Video, Long Form
Rob Small (video producer), Sophie Muller (video director) & Annie Lennox for DivaNew Age
Best New Age Album
Enya for Shepherd MoonsPackaging and notes
Best Album Package
Melanie Nissen (art director) for Spellbound performed by Paula Abdul

Best Album Notes
Ahmet Ertegun, Arif Mardin, Dave Marsh, David Ritz, Jerry Wexler, Thulani Davis & Tom Dowd (notes writers) for Queen of Soul - The Atlantic Recordings performed by Aretha Franklin

Polka
Best Polka Album
Walter Ostanek for 35th Anniversary  performed by Walter Ostanek & His Band

Pop
Best Pop Vocal Performance, Female"Constant Craving"-k.d. langBest Pop Vocal Performance, Male"Tears in Heaven"-Eric ClaptonBest Pop Performance by a Duo or Group with Vocal
Celine Dion & Peabo Bryson for "Beauty and the Beast"
Best Pop Instrumental Performance
Richard S. Kaufman (conductor) for "Beauty and the Beast"

Production and engineering
Best Engineered Album, Non-Classical
Bruce Swedien & Teddy Riley (engineers) for Dangerous performed by Michael Jackson

Best Engineered Album, Classical
James Lock, John Pellowe, Jonathan Stokes & Philip Siney (engineers), Georg Solti (conductor) & the Vienna Philharmonic for R. Strauss: Die Frau Ohne SchattenProducer of the Year (Non-Classical)
Babyface & L.A. Reid
Brian Eno & Daniel Lanois

Classical Producer of the Year
Michael Fine

R&B
Best R&B Vocal Performance, Female
Chaka Khan for The Woman I AmBest R&B Vocal Performance, Male
Al Jarreau for Heaven and Earth 
Best R&B Performance by a Duo or Group with Vocal
Boyz II Men for "End of the Road"
Best R&B Instrumental Performance
Miles Davis for Doo-BopBest Rhythm & Blues Song
Babyface, L.A. Reid & Daryl Simmons (songwriters) for "End of the Road" performed by Boyz II Men

Rap
Best Rap Solo Performance
Sir Mix-a-Lot for Baby Got BackBest Rap Performance by a Duo or Group
Arrested Development for TennesseeReggae
Best Reggae Album
Shabba Ranks for X-tra NakedRock
Best Rock Vocal Performance, Female 
Melissa Etheridge for "Ain't It Heavy"
Best Rock Vocal Performance, Male 
Eric Clapton for UnpluggedBest Rock Performance by a Duo or Group with Vocal
U2 for Achtung BabyBest Rock Instrumental Performance
Stevie Ray Vaughan & Double Trouble for "Little Wing"
Best Hard Rock Performance with Vocal
Red Hot Chili Peppers for "Give It Away"
Best Metal Performance
Nine Inch Nails for "Wish"
Best Rock Song
Eric Clapton & Jim Gordon (songwriters) for "Layla" performed by Eric Clapton

Spoken
Best Spoken Word or Non-musical Album
Earvin "Magic" Johnson & Robert O'Keefe for What You Can Do to Avoid AIDSTraditional pop
Best Traditional Pop Vocal Performance
"Perfectly Frank" - Tony Bennett

World
Best World Music Album
Sérgio Mendes for Brasileiro''

Special merit awards

MusiCares Person of the Year
Natalie Cole

References

External links
 35th Annual Grammy Awards (Event) at the Internet Movie Database
 35th Annual Grammy Awards (Broadcast) at the Internet Movie Database

 035
1993 in California
1993 music awards
1993 in Los Angeles
1993 in American music
Grammy
February 1993 events in the United States